Fernand Guillou (6 January 1926 – 7 October 2009) was a French basketball player who competed in the 1948 Summer Olympics. He was part of the French basketball team, which won the silver medal.

References

External links
Fernand Guillou's profile at databaseOlympics
Fernand Guillou's profile at the Fédération Française de Basket-Ball 

1926 births
2009 deaths
French men's basketball players
Olympic basketball players of France
Basketball players at the 1948 Summer Olympics
Olympic silver medalists for France
Olympic medalists in basketball
French people of Breton descent
Medalists at the 1948 Summer Olympics
1950 FIBA World Championship players